The Carr ministry (1997–1999) or Second Carr ministry was the 86th ministry of the New South Wales Government, and was led by the 39th Premier of New South Wales, Bob Carr, representing the Labor Party.

The ministry covered the period from 1 December 1997 until 8 April 1999, when Carr led Labor to victory at the 1999 state election.

Composition of ministry
The ministry covered the period from 1 December 1997. There was a minor rearrangement in April 1998 when Brian Langton relinquished his ministerial duties due to his involvement in a political scandal, after the Independent Commission Against Corruption (ICAC) found him guilty of corruptly rorting charter plane expenses. The ICAC deemed that Langton had sought advantage for himself by deliberate deception of the Parliamentary Accounts Department. The ministry continued until 8 April 1999 when the ministry was configured following the 1999 state election.

 
Ministers are members of the Legislative Assembly unless otherwise noted.

See also

 Members of the New South Wales Legislative Assembly, 1995–1999
Members of the New South Wales Legislative Council, 1995–1999

Notes

References

 

! colspan="3" style="border-top: 5px solid #cccccc" | New South Wales government ministries

New South Wales ministries
1997 establishments in Australia
1999 disestablishments in Australia
Australian Labor Party ministries in New South Wales